Alexotypa is a genus of moths in the Carposinidae family.

Species
Alexotypa caradjai Diakonoff, 1989
Alexotypa japonica (Walsingham, 1900) (originally in Propedesis)
Alexotypa vitiata (Meyrick, 1913) (originally in Meridarchis)

References

Natural History Museum Lepidoptera generic names catalog

Carposinidae